Tungsenia is an extinct genus of basal tetrapodomorph bony fish known from the ~409 mya (Early Devonian) of northeastern Yunnan Province, China. Its remains were discovered in the Posongchong Formation. It is the basalmost known tetrapodomorph.

References

Tetrapodomorphs
Fossil taxa described in 2012